The Circuit des Nations ("Circuit of the Nations") is a long street circuit of  between Lake Geneva and the Place des Nations in Geneva, Switzerland. It hosted the Grand Prix de Nations, similar to a Formula One race; the Grand Prix de Genève, similar to a Formula Two race; and various championship events. The first Grand Prix de Genève was held in Meyrin in 1931 and won by Marcel Lehoux, racing for Bugatti.

Geneva race-track (Switzerland) 
The Geneva race-track was established between the lake (Geneva) and the Nations square. Grand-Prix races were organised after World War II, on this track, similar to Formula 1 or Formula 2 races, as well as non championship ones. In total 5 major events happened on this track between 1946 and 1950.
Key pilots came here to compete: among them Giuseppe Farina, Raymond Sommer, Maurice Trintignant, Juan Manuel Fangio, Prince Bira (who had established residency, in Geneva).

The closest race-tracks were Aix les Bains – France (Circuit du Lac) and Lausanne (Circuit du Léman or Blécherette).  All were temporary urban race-tracks that disappeared shortly after the Le Mans accident in 1955, or before.

Note: contradictory information about the length of the track have been witnessed. Measurement on maps indicate that the shorter length is more likely.

1st Grand Prix des Nations 
FIA Grand Prix, Circuit des Nations, Geneva, Switzerland – July 21, 1946

2nd Grand Prix de Genève 
FIA Formula 2, non championship race, Circuit des Nations, Geneva, Switzerland – May 2, 1948

2nd Grand Prix des Nations 
FIA Formula 1, non championship race, Circuit des Nations, Geneva, Switzerland – May 2, 1948

3rd Grand Prix de Genève 
FIA Formula 2, non championship race, Circuit des Nations, Geneva, Switzerland – July 30, 1950

3rd Grand Prix des Nations 
FIA Formula 1, non championship race, Circuit des Nations, Geneva, Switzerland – July 30, 1950

A tragic end 
Towards the end of the third Grand Prix des Nations (1950), the engine of Alberto Ascari's Ferrari 340 blew up, pouring oil onto the corner at the end of the Avenue de la Paix. Behind him Luigi Villoresi, in a Ferrari 275, could not avoid the oil, his car skidded, went over the security barrier and ploughed into the crowd. Three spectators were killed, another twenty were injured. Villoresi survived with a severely fractured leg.

After this tragedy, stemming like others from the use of street circuits ill-adapted to increasingly high-speed motor racing, the organisers cancelled the following year's event. Geneva would never again host a Grand Prix race.

In 1958 motor racing was banned altogether by the Swiss government as an unsafe spectator sport following the death of 80 people at the 1955 24 Hours of Le Mans race.

References 

 Ultimate Racing History
 8W Forix.com
 (es) 3ème Grand Prix des Nations 1950

Motorsport venues in Switzerland
Pre-World Championship Grands Prix